Ace of Aces, also known as Bird of Prey, is a 1933 American pre-Code war film based on the story "The Bird of Prey" by World War I pilot John Monk Saunders that explores how war can turn a man's moral compass from pacifism to warmonger. Starring Richard Dix, it was similar to many of the period films that appeared to glorify the "knights of the air", but was more complex, examining the motivations of those who choose to go to war.

Plot
When the United States enters World War I, Rocky Thorne has no interest in joining the military, but just wants to pursue his career as a sculptor. He is cynical about the purpose of the war and the enthusiasm of those who have enlisted, comparing them to lemmings that will swim until they drown themselves. But his fiancée, Nancy Adams, becomes a Red Cross nurse; she mocks his pacifism and accuses him of cowardice. To prove his bravery, he enlists and becomes a fighter pilot as part of the American Expeditionary Forces. Arriving at his assigned squadron, he is concerned about the people he is going to be shooting at; but his initial reluctance lasts only until he is shot at himself.  Then he retaliates, shooting down his first enemy aircraft.

Rocky now renounces his past attitude and becomes completely committed to the war in the air, even taking individual flights against orders, to get more chances to shoot down Germans.  In a few months he becomes the leading ace. Then, while on furlough in Paris, he runs into his former love, who is a nurse on the front lines.  She has been impacted by her experiences and is torn by guilt.  When Rocky says that he does not want to waste his valuable leave time on talking and demeans her moral attitude for not wanting to spend the night with him, she agrees to do it.

Back at the squadron, a German cadet on a mercy mission drops a note over the airfield, telling the Americans that one of their pilots who was shot down is alive as a prisoner.  At this point Rocky's plane appears. Not having seen the note being dropped, Rocky attacks and shoots down the young German, who is badly injured but not killed.

At the hospital, Rocky finds the German in the next bed. The young man is in agony and is not allowed liquids because of a stomach wound. Eventually he begs for water, saying he is going to die anyway, and Rocky leaves a bottle of wine by his bedside. Then Rocky is told he is being transferred away from the front to become an instructor.  While he does not tell anyone, he feels guilty over the German's death, so the transfer comes as a relief.  But before it takes effect, he learns that a young pilot has bettered his record of victories. He flies another unauthorized mission to fight individually against the newest German aircraft. But as he prepares to close in for the kill, he again thinks about the German cadet, and is unable to fire. The Germans see him and shoot him down, but he lives to return home to his sweetheart after the war.

In the final scene, he still feels guilty for what he became, and says he has been unable to sculpt. But Nancy is supportive and still wants to marry him. They will get past it together.

Cast

William Cagney, the brother of James Cagney made his motion picture debut in Ace of Aces as an actor and went on to become a Hollywood producer.

Production

John Monk Saunders wrote stories about flying that were influenced by his service as a flight instructor in World War I. In 1933, two of the stories that had a strong antiwar theme were turned into films. The first story, Death in the Morning was turned into The Eagle and the Hawk released in May 1933.

Ace of Aces featured five Waco 7s, five Travel Air Model B "Wichita Fokkers", a small number of Nieuport 28s, a Curtiss JN4 Jenny, Garland-Lincoln LF-1 (Nieuport 28 Replica), and a Fleet Model 1, along with two SE.5 mock-ups while a Waco also served as a camera plane for the aerial sequences. Noted Hollywood stunt pilot Frank Clarke was one of a team of eight pilots who flew in the film. Some of the aerial footage was taken from the earlier Howard Hughes opus, Hell's Angels (1930).

Reception
Contemporary reviews of Ace of Aces were not positive; Mordaunt Hall, The New York Times reviewer noted, "In a style that is slow, obvious and at times childishly sentimental  ... Richard Dix is heavy-handed and generally inexpert in the principal role. Elizabeth Allan, who seems to one biased observer to be the most genuinely talented and charming of Hollywood's recent acquisitions, gives 'Ace of Aces' its only good moments." More recent reviews have focused on the "strongly anti-war drama", and the callousness of killing men in the air in Ace of Aces, revealed as the hero has to examine his life and the choices he has made as a fighter pilot. Leonard Maltin considered it, a "Sincere antiwar tract, but far too melodramatic."

Filmmaker Guy Maddin is an avowed fan of the film, describing it in an article for Film Comment as an "absolutely perfect low-budget fighter-pilot picture that deserves the same reputation as Gun Crazy" and praising Dix as a "forgotten American treasure."

References

Notes

Bibliography

 Farmer, James H. Broken Wings: Hollywood's Air Crashes. Missoula, Montana: Pictorial Histories Pub Co., 1984. .
 Neibaur, James L. The RKO Features: A Complete Filmography of the Feature Films Released or Produced by RKO Radio. Jefferson, North Carolina: McFarland & Company, 2005. .
 Wynne, H. Hugh. The Motion Picture Stunt Pilots and Hollywood's Classic Aviation Movies. Missoula, Montana: Pictorial Histories Publishing Co., 1987. .

External links
 
 
 
 

1933 films
American war drama films
American black-and-white films
1930s English-language films
Films based on short fiction
Films directed by J. Walter Ruben
Western Front (World War I) films
RKO Pictures films
World War I aviation films
American World War I films
1930s war drama films
1933 drama films
1930s American films